Herbert Williams may refer to:

Sir Herbert Williams, 1st Baronet (1884–1954), British politician and Conservative Member of Parliament
Sir Herbert Williams-Wynn, 7th Baronet (1860–1944), British politician and Member of Parliament
Herbert Williams (bishop) (1860–1937), Anglican bishop in New Zealand
Herbert Williams (cricketer, born 1860) (1860–1942), English cricketer
Herbert Williams (cricketer, born 1900) (1900–1974), English cricketer
Herbert Williams (sailor) (1908–1990), American Olympic sailor
Herbert Williams (politician) (1890–1943), member of the Queensland Legislative Assembly
Herbie Williams (born 1940), Welsh footballer
Herb Williams (born 1958), American basketball player
Herb Williams (American football) (born 1958), American football defensive back
Herb Williams (footballer) (1885–1924), Australian rules footballer
Herbert "Magic" Williams, fictional character appearing in one episode of the original Quantum Leap and as a main character in the 2022 revival of Quantum Leap

See also
Bert Williams (disambiguation)